Ratnakar Chaini (25 Aug 1945 – 18 April 2020) was an Indian writer and academician. He was known for his works in Odia. Born in Cuttack, he served as the president of "Sanskar Bharti", and as president of the Utkal Sahitya Samaj in 2010. Some of his notable writings are Santha Kabi Achyutananda, Niraba Kolahala, Kabi Gopalkrushna, Asha brundabana, Achyatananda gitabali, Ajira galpa, Surjyastra upabana, and Kaha Lalita.

Chaini completed his matriculation from Nemal High School. Then went to do his graduation from Christ College Cuttack. He completed his post-graduation in Ravenshaw College and PhD from Utkal University in 1978. In 1979 started his job as a lecturer and taught in various Government colleges of Odisha to finally retire as the Hod from Sailabala Women's College, Cuttack .

References 

1945 births
2020 deaths
People from Cuttack
Writers from Odisha
Odia-language writers
Ravenshaw University alumni
Recipients of the Odisha Sahitya Akademi Award
Utkal University alumni